Sumida-Gepro FC  is a professional football club from the Mongolian capital Ulaanbaatar, currently playing in the Mongolian National Premier League. The club was established in 2013 and was promoted to the Mongolian Premier League for the first time after becoming runners-up for the Mongolia 1st League in 2017.

Domestic history

Squad

References

External links
Mongolian Football Federation profile 

Football clubs in Mongolia
Association football clubs established in 2012